Eirik Lae Solberg (born 3 April 1971) is a Norwegian politician for the Conservative Party.

Education
Solberg holds a bachelor's degree in economics from the London School of Economics and Political Science (LSE) and a master's degree in European history and politics from the University of Cambridge.

Political career

Local politics
Solberg was elected to the Oslo City Council in 2007, and led the committee on finance and the Conservative group from 2009 to 2013. 

In 2014, he was appointed city commissioner for finance, a post he held until the Conservative coalition lost the 2015 local elections.

He was the Oslo Conservative Party's candidate for Governing Mayor in the 2019 local elections. He lost the election to incumbent Raymond Johansen, and resigned as the Conservatives' group leader. He did however retain his council seat.

On 1 July 2022, he was again chosen as the Oslo Conservatives' candidate for Governing Mayor for the 2023 local elections.

Parliament
He served as a deputy representative to the Norwegian Parliament from Buskerud from 1993 to 1997. He was re-elected as a deputy representative in the 2021 election, this time for Oslo. He met as permanent representative for Nikolai Astrup from 1 to 14 October 2021 at the end of the Solberg Cabinet's tenure.

Government
During the second cabinet Bondevik, Solberg was political advisor in the Ministry of Trade and Industry from 2001 to March 2004, and State Secretary in the Ministry of Work Affairs and Administration (renamed Ministry of Modernization in June 2004) from March 2004 to 2005. In the elections that year, the second cabinet Bondevik fell, thus Solberg lost his position. He was appointed state secretary in the Ministry of Trade and Fisheries in 2013 and held the post until 2014.

Non-politics
In 2020, Lae Solberg was hired to work for Deloitte as a strategic consultant for the public sector.

Personal life
Lae Solberg is married to Hanna Rommerud, with whom he has one son.

References

External links

1971 births
Living people
Conservative Party (Norway) politicians
Norwegian state secretaries
Deputy members of the Storting